Chairman of the Board is a 1998 American comedy film directed by Alex Zamm, and starring Carrot Top in his only lead role in a feature-length film. In the film, a surfer and inventor named Edison inherits and runs a billionaire's company. It was poorly received by both critics and audiences, and was a box office bomb. Both Carrot Top and Raquel Welch received Golden Raspberry Award nominations for their roles in the film.

Plot
Edison (Carrot Top) is a poor, failed inventor and surf bum who's spent his rent money on another unsuccessful invention. After failing to make money at a variety of jobs, Edison soon runs into a wealthy business magnate Armand McMillan (Jack Warden), whose car has broken down on the side of the road. After Edison uses his inventions to assist Armand, the old man becomes impressed with his ingenuity, and the two go surfing together and quickly become friends. When Armand passes away shortly thereafter, he leaves Edison 45% of the shares in his large invention corporation, and leaves Bradford (Larry Miller), his jealous nephew and only living relative, a surfboard as his only inheritance. Bradford attempts to derail Edison's success by stealing his formula for glow in the dark, which does not exist in the world of the film. Bradford shares it with a consumer who covers himself in it and alleges that Edison's prize invention—a portable TV/TV dinner combo—leaks radiation. When Edison reveals that radiation causes sickness and death, but not a literal glowing, the company is saved, Bradford is arrested, and Grace Kosik (Raquel Welch) makes a deal with the company to testify against Bradford. In the end, Edison appoints his girlfriend Natalie Stockwell (Courtney Thorne-Smith) to run the company.

Cast
 Carrot Top – Edison
 Courtney Thorne-Smith – Natalie Stockwell
 Larry Miller – Bradford McMillan
 Raquel Welch – Grace Kosik
 Mystro Clark – Ty
 Jack Plotnick – Zak
 Jack Warden – Armand McMillan
 Estelle Harris – Ms. Krubavitch
 Bill Erwin – Landers
 M. Emmet Walsh – Freemont
 Jack McGee – Harlan Granger
 Glenn Shadix – Larry
 Fred Stoller – Toby, McMillan Gate Guard
 Taylor Negron – Mr Withermeyer
 Jack Riley – Condom Boss
 Rance Howard – Rev. Hatley
 Mark Kriski – Newscaster
 Cindy Margolis – Tennis Instructor
 Butterbean – Museum Security Guard
 Little Richard – Himself

Production
Phillip Goldfine, who served as senior VP of Trimark Pictures, is credited with green lighting the film. The film was shot in Southern California whereas Carrot Top himself comes from Florida.

On May 15, 1997, Courtney Thorne-Smith made a guest appearance on Late Night With Conan O’Brien to promote two projects she was involved in: the season finale of Melrose Place and Chairman of the Board. Comedian Norm Macdonald was a fellow guest on that night and, sitting next to Thorne-Smith, he heckled both Carrot Top and the film Thorne-Smith was promoting, incredulous that Thorne-Smith had left Melrose Place to star in a film with Carrot Top. When O'Brien asked Thorne-Smith the name of the film, Macdonald interjected, "If it's got Carrot Top in it, do you know what a good name for it would be? Box Office Poison." After Thorne-Smith revealed the Chairman of the Board title and O'Brien challenged Macdonald to make fun of it, Macdonald quipped, "I bet the 'Board' is spelt B-O-R-E-D!" Macdonald said he apologized to Carrot Top, saying he "felt kind of bad after that" and that he had not considered that Carrot Top might have been watching that night.

Following Macdonald's death in 2021, Courtney Thorne-Smith later told Vanity Fair,

Reception
Chairman of the Board received negative reviews. On Rotten Tomatoes, it has an approval rating of 13% based on reviews from 8 critics.

David Kronke of the Los Angeles Times referred to the film as "a standard-issue rags-to-riches plot, enlivened by only by a tchotchke-heavy production design that might engage those entranced by bright, shiny objects", and compared the film to "Good Burger, but with French tickler jokes." Jay Boyar trashed the film in the Orlando Sentinel, giving the film just one star. Lisa Schwarzbaum of Entertainment Weekly gave the film a D−.

The film also resulted in Carrot Top being nominated for Worst New Star, and Raquel Welch being nominated for Worst Supporting Actress at the 1998 Golden Raspberry Awards.

Notes

External links
 
 
 
 

1998 films
1990s screwball comedy films
American business films
American screwball comedy films
Films directed by Alex Zamm
Films set in Los Angeles
American surfing films
Trimark Pictures films
1990s business films
1998 directorial debut films
1998 comedy films
1990s English-language films
1990s American films